Corvallis High School may refer to:

Corvallis High School (California)
Corvallis High School (Montana)
Corvallis High School (Oregon)